Desulfitobacterium dehalogenans is a species of bacteria. They are facultative organohalide respiring bacteria capable of reductively dechlorinating chlorophenolic compounds and tetrachloroethene. They are  anaerobic, motile, Gram-positive and rod-shaped bacteria capable of utilizing a wide range of electron donors and acceptors. The type strain JW/IU-DCT, DSM 9161, NCBi taxonomy ID 756499.

There are two described isolates from this species strains JW/IU-DCT and PCE1. The genomes of both strains have been sequenced, none of the strains encodes any plasmids, in addition to six reductive dehalogenases, the genomes encodes a large number of genes for utilization of a range of electron donors and acceptors.

References

Further reading

External links 
 
 LPSN
 Type strain of Desulfitobacterium dehalogenans at BacDive -  the Bacterial Diversity Metadatabase

Gram-positive bacteria
Bacteria described in 1994